Geku railway is a railway connecting Golmud and Korla, in western China. Construction started in November 2014 and was completed in 2020. The investment is estimated to be CN¥36 billion (~US$6 billion). The line connects the Qinghai–Tibet railway and the Southern Xinjiang railway. It's the third railway connecting Xinjiang province with another Chinese province and the third line to Golmud after the Qinghai–Tibet railway and the 2019 Golmud–Dunhuang railway.

The railway crosses the Qaidam Basin, the Altyn-Tagh mountain range, and the Taklamakan Desert. As the third rail artery linking Xinjiang with neighboring provinces, the line cut travel time between the two places from 26 hours to 12 hours.

The railway generally follows the route of Qinghai Provincial Highway 303 (from Golmud to Mangya Lake 茫崖湖), China National Highway 315 (from Mangya Lake to Ruoqiang) and China National Highway 218 (from Ruoqiang to Korla). 

The line is used for passenger travel and cargo such as petroleum products.

South Xinjiang loop
Combined with the Hotan–Ruoqiang railway along the southern rim of the Tarim Basin (which opened on June 16 2022), the Kashgar–Hotan railway, the Korla–Kashgar section of the Southern Xinjiang railway, and the Ruoqiang–Korla section of the Golmud–Korla railway, railways now form a  loop around the Tarim Basin.

History
The remaining section opened on 9 December 2020.

On 11 October 2021, service frequency between Golmud and Mangyazhen was increased to one train in each direction per day.

See also
Golmud–Dunhuang railway
Qinghai–Tibet railway

References

Railway lines in China
Rail transport in Qinghai
Rail transport in Xinjiang
Railway lines opened in 2020